Tonia Svaier (born 26 April 1968) is a Greek rower. She competed at the 1988 Summer Olympics, 1992 Summer Olympics and the 1996 Summer Olympics.

References

1968 births
Living people
Greek female rowers
Olympic rowers of Greece
Rowers at the 1988 Summer Olympics
Rowers at the 1992 Summer Olympics
Rowers at the 1996 Summer Olympics
Rowers from Ioannina